Robert Stanard (August 17, 1781 – May 14, 1846) was a Virginia lawyer, judge and political figure.  He was the 16th Speaker of the Virginia House of Delegates and later a judge on the Virginia Supreme Court of Appeals.

Biography
The son of William Stanard and Elizabeth Carter, Robert Stanard was born in Spotsylvania County, Virginia, on August 17, 1781.  In 1798, he attended the College of William and Mary, where he studied law.  Stanard subsequently began the private practice of law, and eventually became a notable figure in the Richmond legal community.  From 1816 to 1817, he was elected as the 16th Speaker of the Virginia House of Delegates. In 1817, he became the United States Attorney for the District of Virginia.

Stanard was later selected as a member of the Virginia Constitutional Convention of 1829-1830, which revised the Constitution of Virginia.  His contribution to the convention were well received and increased his prominence.  In 1839, he was elected to the Virginia Supreme Court of Appeals, upon the death of Judge William Brockenbrough.  He remained on that court until his death in 1846.

The town of Stanardsville, Virginia, is named after him.

Personal life
Stanard married Jane Stith Craig on February 13, 1812, and fathered four children; Robert Craig (b. May 17, 1814), William Beverly (b. March 15, 1819}, Mary Elizabeth (b. 1822) and Jane Stith (b. 1822). His son, Robert Craig Stanard, was a childhood friend of poet Edgar Allan Poe, and Jane Stith Craig was the subject of Poe's poem "To Helen". She died on April 28, 1824, at the age of 33 or 34, and Stanard never remarried. She is known posthumously as "Poe's Helen".

References
 

 The Political Graveyard

External links
Jane Stith Craig Stanard at Find a Grave

Justices of the Supreme Court of Virginia
United States Attorneys for the District of Virginia
Virginia state court judges
Speakers of the Virginia House of Delegates
1781 births
1846 deaths
19th-century American lawyers
19th-century American judges
19th-century American politicians
People from Spotsylvania County, Virginia
College of William & Mary alumni